Brightwood may refer to:

Places
 Brightwood (Washington, D.C.), a neighborhood located in the northwestern quadrant of Washington, D.C.
 Brightwood, Nova Scotia, a neighbourhood in Dartmouth, and part of District 9 of the Halifax Regional Municipality in Nova Scotia, Canada
 Brightwood, Oregon, an unincorporated community within the Mount Hood Corridor in Clackamas County, Oregon, United States
 Brightwood, Virginia, a census-designated place in Madison County, Virginia
 Marshall-Shadeland, Pittsburgh (aka Brightwood), a neighborhood on Pittsburgh, Pennsylvania's North Side
 Brightwood, Springfield, Massachusetts, a neighborhood on the northwest side of Springfield, MA

Other
 Brightwood (Hagerstown, Maryland), a historic home near Hagerstown, Washington County, Maryland, United States
 Brightwood, the fictional American town in the 2014 science fiction thriller film Transcendence